List of railway companies in Japan lists Japanese railway operators.

Those in italics are the third-sector operators; being half-public, half-private.

Japan Railways Group
The Japan Railways Group consists of the seven companies that were formed after the privatization of the Japanese National Railways.

Passenger
 
 
 
 
 
 
Freight

Major sixteen private railways
Kantō region
 Keikyu Corporation 京浜急行電鉄 (京急)
 Keio Corporation 京王電鉄
 Keisei Electric Railway 京成電鉄
 Odakyu Electric Railway 小田急電鉄
 Sagami Railway (Sotetsu) 相模鉄道 (相鉄)
 Seibu Railway 西武鉄道
 Tobu Railway 東武鉄道
 Tokyo Metro 東京地下鉄 (東京メトロ)
 Tokyu Corporation 東京急行電鉄 (東急)

Chūbu region
 Nagoya Railroad (Meitetsu) 名古屋鉄道 (名鉄)

Kansai region
 Hankyu Corporation 阪急電鉄
 Hanshin Electric Railway 阪神電気鉄道
 Keihan Electric Railway 京阪電気鉄道
 Kintetsu Railway 近畿日本鉄道 (近鉄)
 Nankai Electric Railway 南海電気鉄道

Kyushu
 Nishi-Nippon Railroad 西日本鉄道 (西鉄 Nishitetsu)

Semi-major six private railways
Kantō region
 Shin-Keisei Electric Railway 新京成電鉄

Kansai region
 Kita-Osaka Kyuko Railway 北大阪急行電鉄 (Kitakyū 北急)
 Kōbe Rapid Transit Railway 神戸高速鉄道 (subway, Category-3 railway operator)
 Sanyo Electric Railway 山陽電気鉄道
 Semboku Rapid Railway 泉北高速鉄道

Other private and third sector railways
From north to south by prefecture where railway operations are headquartered. Category-3 railway operators and subsidiary companies are not listed. Some English names are unofficial.

Hokkaido
 South Hokkaido Railway Company 道南いさりび鉄道株式会社

Tōhoku region
Aomori Prefecture
 Aoimori Railway 青い森鉄道
 Kōnan Railway 弘南鉄道
 Tsugaru Railway 津軽鉄道 (Tsutetsu 津鉄)

Iwate Prefecture
 IGR Iwate Galaxy Railway IGRいわて銀河鉄道
 Sanriku Railway 三陸鉄道 (Santetsu 三鉄)

Miyagi Prefecture
 Sendai Airport Transit 仙台空港鉄道

Akita Prefecture
 Akita Nairiku Jūkan Railway 秋田内陸縦貫鉄道
 Yuri Kōgen Railway 由利高原鉄道

Yamagata Prefecture
 Yamagata Railway 山形鉄道

Fukushima Prefecture
 AbukumaExpress 阿武隈急行 (Abukyū 阿武急)
 Aizu Railway 会津鉄道
 Fukushima Transportation 福島交通

Kantō region
Ibaraki Prefecture
 Hitachinaka Seaside Railway ひたちなか海浜鉄道
 Kantō Railway 関東鉄道 (Kantetsu 関鉄)
 Kashima Rinkai Railway 鹿島臨海鉄道

Tochigi Prefecture
 Mōka Railway 真岡鐵道
 Yagan Railway 野岩鉄道

Gunma Prefecture
 Jōmō Electric Railway 上毛電気鉄道
 Jōshin Dentetsu 上信電鉄
 Watarase Keikoku Railway わたらせ渓谷鐵道

Saitama Prefecture
 Chichibu Railway 秩父鉄道
 Saitama Railway 埼玉高速鉄道 (SR)

Chiba Prefecture
 Chōshi Electric Railway 銚子電気鉄道 (Chōden 銚電)
 Hokusō Railway 北総鉄道
 Isumi Railway いすみ鉄道
 Kominato Railway 小湊鉄道
 Ryūtetsu 流鉄
 Shibayama Railway 芝山鉄道
 Tōyō Rapid Railway 東葉高速鉄道

Tokyo
 Metropolitan Intercity Railway Company (Tsukuba Express) 首都圏新都市鉄道 (つくばエクスプレス)
 Tōkyō Waterfront Area Rapid Transit (Rinkai Line) 東京臨海高速鉄道 (りんかい線) (TWR)

Kanagawa Prefecture
 Hakone Tozan Railway 箱根登山鉄道
 Izuhakone Railway (Daiyūzan Line) 伊豆箱根鉄道 (大雄山線)
 Yokohama Minatomirai Railway 横浜高速鉄道

Chūbu region
Niigata Prefecture
 Echigo Tokimeki Railway えちごトキめき鉄道
 Hokuetsu Express 北越急行

Toyama Prefecture
 Ainokaze Toyama Railway あいの風とやま鉄道
 Kurobe Gorge Railway 黒部峡谷鉄道
 Toyama Chihō Railway 富山地方鉄道 (Chitetsu 地鉄)

Ishikawa Prefecture
 Hokuriku Railroad 北陸鉄道 (Hokutetsu 北鉄)
 IR Ishikawa Railway IRいしかわ鉄道
 Noto Railway のと鉄道

Fukui Prefecture
 Echizen Railway えちぜん鉄道

Yamanashi Prefecture
 Fuji Kyūkō 富士急行 (Fujikyū, Fuji-Q 富士急)

Nagano Prefecture
 Alpico Kōtsū アルピコ交通
 Nagano Electric Railway 長野電気鉄道 (Nagaden 長電)
 Shinano Railway しなの鉄道
 Ueda Electric Railway 上田電鉄 (Ueden 上電)

Gifu Prefecture
 Akechi Railway 明知鉄道 (Aketetsu 明鉄)
 Nagaragawa Railway 長良川鉄道 (Nagatetsu 長鉄)
 Tarumi Railway 樽見鉄道
 Yōrō Railway 養老鉄道

Shizuoka Prefecture
 Enshū Railway 遠州鉄道 (Entetsu 遠鉄)
 Gakunan Railway 岳南電車
 Izuhakone Railway (Sunzu Line) 伊豆箱根鉄道 (駿豆線)
 Izukyū Corporation 伊豆急行 (伊豆急)
 Ōigawa Railway 大井川鐵道 (Daitetsu 大鐵)
 Shizuoka Railway 静岡鉄道 (Shizutetsu 静鉄)
 Tenryū Hamanako Railroad 天竜浜名湖鉄道 (Tenhama 天浜)

Aichi Prefecture
 Aichi Loop Line Company 愛知環状鉄道 (Aikan 愛環)
 Nagoya Seaside Rapid Railway (Aonami Line) 名古屋臨海高速鉄道 (あおなみ線)
 Tōkai Transport Service 東海交通事業 (TKJ)
 Toyohashi Railroad 豊橋鉄道 (Toyotetsu 豊鉄)

Kansai region
Mie Prefecture
 Iga Railway 伊賀鉄道
 Ise Railway 伊勢鉄道 (Isetetsu 伊勢鉄)
 Sangi Railway 三岐鉄道

Shiga Prefecture
 Ohmi Railway 近江鉄道
 Shigaraki Kohgen Railway 信楽高原鐵道

Kyoto Prefecture
 Eizan Electric Railway 叡山電鉄 (Eiden 叡電)
 Sagano Scenic Railway 嵯峨野観光鉄道
 Willer Trains (Kyoto Tango Railway) WILLER TRAINS (京都丹後鉄道)

Osaka Prefecture
 Mizuma Railway 水間鉄道 (Suitetsu 水鉄)

Hyōgo Prefecture
 Hōjō Railway 北条鉄道
 Kobe Electric Railway 神戸電気鉄道 (Shintetsu 神鉄)
 Nose Electric Railway 能勢電気鉄道 (Noseden 能勢電)

Wakayama Prefecture
 Kishū Railway 紀州鉄道
 Wakayama Electric Railway 和歌山電鐵

Chūgoku region
Tottori Prefecture
 Chizu Express 智頭急行
 Wakasa Railway 若桜鉄道

Shimane Prefecture
 Ichibata Electric Railway 一畑電車

Okayama Prefecture
 Ibara Railway 井原鉄道
 Mizushima Rinkai Railway 水島臨海鉄道

Yamaguchi Prefecture
 Nishikigawa Railway 錦川鉄道

Shikoku
Tokushima Prefecture
 Asa Kaigan Railway 阿佐海岸鉄道 (Asatetsu 阿佐鉄)

Kagawa Prefecture
 Takamatsu-Kotohira Electric Railroad 高松琴平電気鉄道 (Kotoden 琴電)

Ehime Prefecture
 Iyo Railway 伊予鉄道 (Iyotetsu 伊予鉄)

Kōchi Prefecture
 Tosa Kuroshio Railway 土佐くろしお鉄道

Kyushu
Fukuoka Prefecture
 Amagi Railway 甘木鉄道 (Amatetsu 甘鉄)
 Heisei Chikuhō Railway 平成筑豊鉄道 (Heichiku 平筑)

Nagasaki Prefecture
 Matsuura Railway 松浦鉄道 (MR)
 Shimabara Railway 島原鉄道 (Shimatetsu 島鉄)

Kumamoto Prefecture
 Hisatsu Orange Railway 肥薩おれんじ鉄道
 Kumagawa Railroad くま川鉄道 (Kumatetsu くま鉄)
 Kumamoto Electric Railway 熊本電気鉄道 (Kumaden 熊電, Kikuchi Electric Railway 菊池電車)
 Minamiaso Railway 南阿蘇鉄道

Subways
 Sapporo City Transportation Bureau (Sapporo Subway) 札幌市交通局 (札幌市営地下鉄)
 Sendai City Transportation Bureau (Sendai Subway) 仙台市交通局 (仙台市営地下鉄)
 Saitama Railway 埼玉高速鉄道 (SR)
 Tokyo Metropolitan Bureau of Transportation (Toei Subway) 東京都交通局 (都営地下鉄)
 Tokyo Waterfront Area Rapid Transit (Rinkai Line) 東京臨海高速鉄道 (りんかい線) (TWR)
 Yokohama City Transportation Bureau (Yokohama Municipal Subway) 横浜市交通局 (横浜市営地下鉄)
 Yokohama Minatomirai Railway (Minatomirai Line) 横浜高速鉄道 (みなとみらい線)
 Transportation Bureau City of Nagoya (Nagoya Municipal Subway) 名古屋市交通局 (名古屋市営地下鉄)
 Kyoto Municipal Transportation Bureau (Kyoto Municipal Subway) 京都市交通局 (京都市営地下鉄)
 Osaka Rapid Electric Tramway (Osaka Metro) 大阪高速電気軌道 (Osaka Metro (大阪メトロ))
 Kobe Municipal Transportation Bureau (Kobe Municipal Subway) 神戸市交通局 (神戸市営地下鉄)
 Hokushin Kyuko Electric Railway 北神急行電鉄
 Fukuoka City Transportation Bureau (Fukuoka City Subway) 福岡市交通局 (福岡市地下鉄)

Monorails
 Chiba Urban Monorail 千葉都市モノレール
 Maihama Resort Line (Disney Resort Line) 舞浜リゾートライン (ディズニーリゾートライン)
 Tokyo Metropolitan Bureau of Transportation (Ueno Zoo Monorail) 東京都交通局 (上野モノレール)
 Tokyo Monorail 東京モノレール
 Tama Toshi Monorail 多摩都市モノレール
 Shōnan Monorail 湘南モノレール
 Ōsaka Monorail 大阪高速鉄道 (大阪モノレール)
 Kitakyushu Monorail 北九州高速鉄道 (北九州モノレール)
 Okinawa Urban Monorail (Yui Rail) 沖縄都市モノレール (ゆいレール)

New transit systems
 Aichi Rapid Transit (Linimo) 愛知高速交通 (リニモ)
 Hiroshima Rapid Transit (Astram Line) 広島高速交通 (アストラムライン)
 Kobe New Transit (Port Liner, Rokkō Liner) 神戸新交通 (ポートライナー, 六甲ライナー)
 Nagoya Guideway Bus (Yutorīto Line) 名古屋ガイドウェイバス (ゆとりーとライン)
 Osaka Municipal Transportation Bureau (New Tram) 大阪市交通局 (ニュートラム)
 Saitama New Urban Transit (New Shuttle) 埼玉新都市交通 (ニューシャトル)
 Seibu Railway (Yamaguchi Line) 西武鉄道 (山口線)
 Skyrail Service スカイレールサービス (also considered as monorail.)
 Yamaman (Yūkarigaoka Line) 山万 (ユーカリが丘線)
 Yokohama Seaside Line (Kanazawa Seaside Line) 横浜シーサイドライン (金沢シーサイドライン)
 Yurikamome ゆりかもめ

Trams
 Chikuhō Electric Railroad 筑豊電気鉄道 (Chikutetsu 筑鉄)
 Enoshima Electric Railway 江ノ島電鉄 (Enoden 江ノ電)
 Fukui Railway 福井鉄道 (Fukutetsu 福鉄)
 Hakodate City Transportation Bureau 函館市交通局
 Hankai Electric Tramway 阪堺電気軌道
 Hiroshima Electric Railway 広島電鉄 (Hiroden 広電)
 Iyo Railway (Matsuyama City Line) 伊予鉄道 (松山市内線) (Iyotetsu 伊予鉄)
 Kagoshima City Transportation Bureau 鹿児島市交通局
 Keifuku Electric Railroad 京福電気鉄道 (Randen 嵐電)
 Keihan Electric Railway (Ōtsu Line) 京阪電気鉄道 (大津線)
 Kumamoto City Transportation Bureau 熊本市交通局
 Manyo Line 万葉線
 Nagasaki Electric Tramway 長崎電気軌道
 Okayama Electric Tramway 岡山電気軌道 (Okaden 岡電)
 Sapporo City Transportation Bureau (Sapporo Streetcar) 札幌市交通局 (札幌市電)
 Tōkyō Metropolitan Government Bureau of Transportation (Toden) 東京都交通局 (都電)
 Tokyu Corporation (Setagaya Line) 東京急行電鉄 (世田谷線) (東急)
 Tosaden Kōtsū とさでん交通 (Tosaden 土佐電)
 Toyama Chihō Railway (Toyama City Tram Line) 富山地方鉄道 (富山市内軌道線) (Chitetsu 地鉄)
 Toyohashi Railroad (Azumada Main Line) 豊橋鉄道 (東田本線) (Toyotetsu 豊鉄)

Funiculars
 Hakone Tozan Railway (Hakone Tozan Cable Car) 箱根登山鉄道 (箱根登山ケーブルカー)
 Hieizan Railway (Sakamoto Cable) 比叡山鉄道 (坂本ケーブル)
 Izuhakone Railway (Jukkokutōge Cable Car) 伊豆箱根鉄道 (十国峠ケーブルカー)
 Keifuku Electric Railroad (Eizan Cable) 京福電気鉄道 (叡山ケーブル) (Randen 嵐電)
 Keihan Electric Railway (Otokoyama Cable) 京阪電気鉄道 (男山ケーブル)
 Kintetsu Railway (Ikoma Cable, Nishi-Shigi Cable) 近畿日本鉄道 (生駒ケーブル, 西信貴ケーブル) (近鉄)
 Kobe City Urban Development (Maya Cablecar) 神戸市都市整備公社 (摩耶ケーブル線, まやビューライン夢散歩)
 Kurama-dera (Kurama-dera Cable) 鞍馬寺 (鞍馬寺ケーブル)
 Mitake Tozan Railway (Mitake Tozan Cable) 御岳登山鉄道 (御岳登山ケーブル)
 Mt. Rokkō Cable Car & Tourism Company (Rokkō Cable) 六甲山観光 (六甲ケーブル)
 Nankai Electric Railway (Kōyasan Cable) 南海電気鉄道 (高野山ケーブル)
 Nose Electric Railway (Myoken Cable) 能勢電鉄 (妙見ケーブル) (Noseden 能勢電)
 Okamoto MFG (Beppu Rakutenchi Cable) 岡本製作所 (別府ラクテンチケーブル)
 Ōyama Cable Car (Ōyama Cable Car) 大山観光電鉄 (大山ケーブルカー)
 Sarakurayama Tozan Railway (Sarakurayama Cable Car) 皿倉山登山鉄道 (皿倉山ケーブルカー)
 Seikan Tunnel Museum (Seikan Tunnel Tappi Shakō Line) 青函トンネル記念館 (青函トンネル竜飛斜坑線)
 Shikoku Cable (Yakuri Cable) 四国ケーブル (八栗ケーブル)
 Takao Tozan Electric Railway (Takao Tozan Cable) 高尾登山電鉄 (高尾登山ケーブル)
 Tango Kairiku Kōtsū (Amanohashidate Cable Car) 丹後海陸交通 (天橋立ケーブルカー) (Tankai 丹海)
 Tateyama Kurobe Kankō 立山黒部貫光 (TKK)
 Tsukuba Kankō Railway (Mount Tsukuba Cable Car) 筑波観光鉄道 (筑波山ケーブルカー)

Trolleybuses
 Tateyama Kurobe Kankō (Tateyama Tunnel Trolleybus) 立山黒部貫光 (立山トンネルトロリーバス)

Freight-only companies
 Akita Rinkai Railway 秋田臨海鉄道
 Fukushima Rinkai Railway 福島臨海鉄道
 Hachinohe Rinkai Railway 八戸臨海鉄道
 Iwate Development Railway 岩手開発鉄道
 Kanagawa Rinkai Railway 神奈川臨海鉄道 (Kanarin 神奈臨)
 Keiyō Rinkai Railway 京葉臨海鉄道 (Rintetsu 臨鉄)
 Kinuura Rinkai Railway 衣浦臨海鉄道
 Nagoya Rinkai Railway 名古屋臨海鉄道
 Seinō Railway 西濃鉄道
 Sendai Rinkai Railway 仙台臨海鉄道
 Taiheiyō Coal Services and Transportation 太平洋石炭販売輸送

Selected discontinued companies

Those with English articles are listed here.
 Chūgen Railway 中原鉄道
 Horonai Railway 官営幌内鉄道
 Japanese Government Railways 鉄道省
 Kaetsunō Railway 加越能鉄道
 Kashima Railway 鹿島鉄道
 Kosaka Smelting & Refining 小坂製錬 (freight)
 Kurihara Den'en Railway くりはら田園鉄道
 Miki Rail-Bus 三木鉄道
 San'yō Railway 山陽鉄道
 Tōkadai New Transit (Peach Liner) 桃花台新交通 (ピーチライナー) (new transit system)
 Towada Kankō Electric Railway 十和田観光電鉄 (Tōtetsu 十鉄)

See also
 List of urban rail systems in Japan
 List of railway companies
 List of railway lines in Japan
 List of railway stations in Japan
 List of railway electrification systems in Japan
 Rail transport in Japan
 Monorails in Japan
 List of aerial lifts in Japan
 List of airport people mover systems
 List of bus operating companies in Japan
 List of defunct railway companies in Japan

References

Companies
Japan
Railway